Rudolf Rhomberg (1 February 1920 - 6 June 1968) was an Austrian film actor.

Partial filmography

 Two Times Lotte (1950) - Photograph
 Call Over the Air (1951) - Piefke
 Eva im Frack (1951)
 Wienerinnen (1952)
 Abenteuer im Schloss (1952) - Karl
 Die Venus vom Tivoli (1953) - Leopold Gerzner
 08/15 (1954) - Unteroffizier Rumpler
 Hello, My Name Is Cox (1955) - Barbesitzer Wilkie
 Love's Carnival (1955) - Wirt
  (1955) - Ortsgruppenführer (uncredited)
 Weil du arm bist, mußt du früher sterben (1956) - Felix Gruber
 Viele kamen vorbei (1956) - Bullig
 Kitty and the Great Big World (1956) - Bistrowirt
 The Girl and the Legend (1957) - Sam
 Marriages Forbidden (1957) - Schorsch Mittnacht
 Der Bauerndoktor von Bayrischzell (1957) - Wachtmeister (uncredited)
 Ein Amerikaner in Salzburg (1958)
 A Woman Who Knows What She Wants (1958) - Lyzeumsdirektor Dr. Kladde
 Resurrection (1958) - Smjelkoff
 Wenn die Conny mit dem Peter (1958) - Alois Specht
 The Beautiful Adventure (1959) - Jules Tardy
 The Man Who Walked Through the Wall (1959) - Der Maler
 Ein Tag, der nie zu Ende geht (1959) - Mr. Mackintosh
 The Good Soldier Schweik (1960) - Stabsarzt
 A Woman for Life (1960) - Ganove #2
 What Is Father Doing in Italy? (1961) - Signore Nobile
 Frau Holle (1961) - Hofmarschall
 Jedermann (1961) - Dicker Vetter
 Stahlnetz:  (1962, TV series episode) - Polizeihauptmeister Rathje
 Snow White and the Seven Jugglers (1962) - Artist Simson
 A Mission for Mr. Dodd (1964) - Glenville
 Lausbubengeschichten (1964) - Pfarrer Falkenberg, 'Kindlein'
 The Blood of the Walsungs (1965) - Opernbesucher
 Aunt Frieda (1965) - Pfarrer 'Kindlein' Falkenberg
 I Am Looking for a Man (1966) - Hoteldirektor Bock
 Once a Greek (1966) - Bruder Bibi
 Onkel Filser (1966) - Kaplan 'Kindlein' Falkenberg
 Glorious Times at the Spessart Inn (1967) - Onkel Max
 Der Lügner und die Nonne (1967) - Father Accursius
 When Ludwig Goes on Manoeuvres (1967) - Falkenberg
 Scarabea: How Much Land Does a Man Need? (Scarabea - wieviel Erde braucht der Mensch?) (1969)

References

External links
 

1920 births
1968 deaths
Austrian male film actors
People from Dornbirn
Burials at the Ostfriedhof (Munich)
20th-century Austrian male actors